Hoplonemertea is an order of ribbon worms in the class Enopla. It contains two suborders:
 Monostilifera
 Polystilifera

The proboscis is armed with one or more stylets; intestine straight, mostly with paired lateral diverticula; no posterior ventral sucker.

References

 
Enopla
Animal orders